Bernard Paul (14 March 1930 – 6 December 1980) was a French film director and screenwriter.

He was the companion of the French actress Françoise Arnoul since 1964.

Worried by the problems of the proletarians, he realized in particular three social films: 
 1969: Time to Live (Le Temps de vivre), starring Marina Vlady, Frédéric de Pasquale, Catherine Allégret
 1972: Handsome Face (Beau masque), starring Dominique Labourier, Luigi Diberti
 1977: Last Exit Before Roissy (Dernière sortie avant Roissy), starring Pierre Mondy, Sabine Haudepin, Françoise Arnoul

Time to Live was entered into the 6th Moscow International Film Festival.

References

External links

1930 births
1980 deaths
French film directors
French male screenwriters
20th-century French screenwriters
Writers from Paris
20th-century French male writers